Leonard Keith Ronson (July 8, 1936 – September 29, 2014) was a professional ice hockey winger who played in the National Hockey League for the New York Rangers and Oakland Seals. He died in 2014, aged 78.

Career statistics

Regular season and playoffs

References

External links
 

1936 births
2014 deaths
Baltimore Clippers players
Canadian ice hockey left wingers
Cleveland Barons (1937–1973) players
Fort Wayne Komets players
Fort Worth Wings players
Galt Black Hawks players
Hamilton Tiger Cubs players
Ice hockey people from Ontario
Indianapolis Chiefs players
Kitchener Beavers (EPHL) players
New York Rangers players
Oakland Seals players
Omaha Knights (CHL) players
Portland Buckaroos players
San Diego Gulls (WHL) players
Sportspeople from Brantford
St. Catharines Teepees players